The 2019–20 season was Sporting Clube de Braga's 99th season in existence and the club's 24th consecutive season in the top flight of Portuguese football. In addition to the domestic league, Braga participated in this season's editions of the Taça de Portugal, the Taça da Liga, and the UEFA Europa League. The season covered the period from 1 July 2019 to 25 July 2020.

Players

Current squad

Out on loan

Pre-season and friendlies

Competitions

Overall record

Primeira Liga

League table

Results summary

Results by round

Matches

Taça de Portugal

Third round

Fourth round

Fifth round

Taça da Liga

Third round

Semi-finals

Final

UEFA Europa League

Third qualifying round

Play-off round

Group stage

Knockout phase

Round of 32

Statistics

Appearances and goals

|-
|colspan="16" align="center"|Goalkeepers

|-
|colspan="16" align="center"|Defenders

|-
|colspan="16" align="center"|Midfielders

|-
|colspan="16" align="center"|Forwards

|-
|colspan="16" align="center"|Players who have made an appearance this season but have left the club

References

External links

S.C. Braga seasons
Braga
Braga